"The Toxic Waltz" is a song by American thrash metal band Exodus, released from the band's third album Fabulous Disaster (1989). Although the song was never released as a single, it is one of Exodus' best-known songs and has held a regular position on their concert setlist since 1989.

Writing and inspiration
The song's lyrics describe "the action in a violent mosh pit: blood on the floor, shots to the head, and general chaos." Frontman Steve "Zetro" Souza said in a 2014 interview with Songfacts that "The Toxic Waltz" was written after guitarist Gary Holt came to band practice, and asked him to write a song about "what fans do at [their] gigs." Souza commented:

Reception
The music video for "The Toxic Waltz" received regular rotation on MTV's Headbangers Ball. It was filmed at The Fillmore in San Francisco, directed by Daniel P. Rodriguez and produced by Brian Good for Antipodes Productions.

"The Toxic Waltz" has become a fan favorite, and is one of the band's most famous live songs, being played at almost every Exodus concert since its debut live performance in 1989.

Personnel
 Steve "Zetro" Souza – vocals
 Gary Holt – guitars
 Rick Hunolt – guitars
 Rob McKillop – bass
 Tom Hunting – drums

References

Exodus (American band) songs
1989 songs
Songs about music